Marcos A. Crespo (born July 29, 1980) is a former Democratic member of the New York State Assembly representing the 85th Assembly District, which includes the Soundview, Clason Point, Longwood, and Hunts Point sections of the South Bronx.

Born in Guayama, Puerto Rico, Crespo and his family moved to New York City when he was a young child. Crespo also spent some time in Lima, Peru, in his young years, thus shaping Crespo's views about the conditions of other countries.

He enrolled in John Jay College in 1996, pursuing a degree in government studies. In 2003, he participated in the State Assembly's internship program, where he was assigned to work with Assemblyman Rubén Díaz Jr. Crespo earned his B.A. degree in 2004, after which he got a position as assistant to New York State Senator Rubén Díaz Sr.

Crespo was first elected to the State Assembly in a June 2009 special election to replace Rubén Díaz Jr., who became Bronx Borough President in 2009.

Early life and education 
Crespo was born in Guayama, Puerto Rico, on July 29, 1980, one of four children of Ivette Fontanez and Alberto Crespo. At a young age, Crespo moved with his family to New York City, where he attended New York City public schools. Crespo also spent three years living in Lima, Perú, where he completed fourth and fifth grades while attending Santa Tersesita. He returned to Puerto Rico with his younger sister and his mother and completed high school at Carmen Bozello de Huyke High School, but soon thereafter, returned to New York to live with his father.

Marcos is a graduate of John Jay College of Criminal Justice, is married and has two young daughters.

Career 

Crespo was one of the youngest members of the New York State Legislature when first elected in 2009. His proposal to create an emergency energy backup system for the State’s health and safety infrastructure during a natural disaster was included in the 2013-2014 State Budget.

In April 2013, Crespo was appointed to the Chairmanship of the Assembly Task Force on New Americans, and in March 2015, he was appointed by Assembly Speaker Carl Heastie to the Chairmanship of the Assembly Puerto Rican/Hispanic Task Force and the Task Force on Demographic Research and Reapportionment. In the Assembly, Crespo authored an anti-fraud bill to protect immigrants that passed both houses of the legislature and worked to expand legal services to underserved communities outside New York City. In the Bronx, Crespo has pushed for Metro-North Railroad service that will cut commuting time into Manhattan by an hour and worked on improving traffic congestion and air quality for the neighborhoods near Hunts Point Terminal Market by building an additional ramp to the Bruckner Expressway, thereby removing hundreds of trucks from local roads. He has fought to secure the remaining funding needed to finish the last phase of the Starlight Park trail.

Crespo has also fought to remove tons of garbage trucked into the Bronx each day from Manhattan, which pollutes Bronx neighborhoods and sickens its residents with severe respiratory diseases. He has called for the building of the Ganesvoort Recycling Facility in Manhattan in order to make Manhattan residents responsible for their own garbage.

In 2015, Crespo was unanimously elected Chair of the Bronx County Democratic Committee, replacing Carl Heastie, who gave up the role when elected Speaker of the New York State Assembly. Crespo was nominated for the post by his Assembly colleague, Jeffrey Dinowitz, and the nomination was seconded by New York City Councilwoman Vanessa Gibson.

Committee membership 
Crespo belongs to these committees.
 Chair, Puerto Rican/Hispanic Task Force
 Member, Committee on Alcoholism and Drug Abuse
 Member, Committee on Cities
 Member, Committee on Energy
 Member, Committee on Environmental Conservation
 Member, Committee on Insurance
 Member, Committee on Transportation
 Member, Black, Puerto Rican, Hispanic & Asian Legislative Caucus
 Co-Chair, Legislative Task Force on Demographic Research and Reapportionment

Election results 
 November 2018 general election, NYS Assembly, 85th AD
{| class="Wikitable"
| Marcos A. Crespo (DEM) || ... || 20,783
|-
| Shonde M. Lennon (REP) || ... || 805
|-
| Joseph Bogdany (CON) || ... || 167
|}

 November 2016 general election, NYS Assembly, 85th AD
{| class="Wikitable"
| Marcos A. Crespo (DEM) || ... || 25,812
|-
| Janelle M. King (REP) || ... || 1,033
|-
| Barbara Santander (CON) || ... || 408
|-
| Daniel Zuger (GRN) || ... || 419
|}

 September 2016 Democratic primary election, NYS Assembly, 85th AD
 {| class="Wikitable"
| Marcos Crespo || ... || 2,635
|- 
| William R. Moore || ... || 972
|}

 November 2014 general election, NYS Assembly, 85th AD
 {| class="Wikitable"
| Marcos Crespo (DEM) || ... || 9,408
|- 
| Janelle M. King (REP) || ... || 357
|}

 September 2014 Democratic primary election, NYS Assembly, 85th AD
 {| class="Wikitable"
| Marcos Crespo || ... || 2,745
|- 
| William R. Moore || ... || 874
|}

 November 2012 general election, NYS Assembly, 85th AD
{| class="Wikitable"
| Marcos A. Crespo (DEM - WOR) || ... || 24,997
|-
| Janelle King (REP) || ... || 620
|-
| Eduardo Ramirez (CON) || ... || 324
|-
| Daniel Zuger (GRN) || ... || 122
|}

 November 2010 general election, NYS Assembly, 85th AD
{| class="Wikitable"
| Marcos A. Crespo (DEM) || ... || 11,213
|-
| Leopold L. Paul (REP) || ... || 438
|-
| Arturo Santiago, Jr. (CON) || ... || 305
|}

 June 2009 special election, NYS Assembly, 85th AD
{| class="Wikitable"
| Marcos Crespo (DEM - WOR) || ... || 1,331
|-
| Leopold L. Paul (REP) || ... || 106
|}

References

External links
Assembly website

1980 births
American politicians of Puerto Rican descent
Puerto Rican people in New York (state) politics
John Jay College of Criminal Justice alumni
Living people
People from Guayama, Puerto Rico
Democratic Party members of the New York State Assembly
Puerto Rican Roman Catholics
21st-century American politicians
Politicians from the Bronx
Hispanic and Latino American state legislators in New York (state)